Chris Shaw may refer to:

 Chris Shaw (photographer) (born 1961), English documentary photographer
 Chris Shaw (musician), drummer and synthesizer player
 Chris Shaw (baseball) (born 1993), baseball player
 Chris Shaw (hardcore musician), bassist

See also
Christopher Shaw (disambiguation)